Ezra Douglas Martinson, MBE was an Anglican bishop in Africa in the third quarter of the 20th century.

Education
Martinson was educated at King's College London.

Career summary
 ordained deacon, 1915
 ordained priest, 1916
 Priest Diocese of Accra, 1915–1937
 Archdeacon of Sedonki
 Archdeacon of Kumasi
Assistant Bishop of Accra, 1951–1963

Honours

Martinson was awarded the MBE for services to education in 1943.

References

Members of the Order of the British Empire
Alumni of King's College London
20th-century Anglican bishops in Ghana
Anglican bishops of Accra
Ghanaian religious leaders